Warren Hills Regional High School is a four-year public high school located on Jackson Valley Road in Washington Township in Warren County, New Jersey, United States, operating as part of the Warren Hills Regional School District. The school offers a comprehensive education for students in ninth through twelfth grades. The student population includes students from Franklin Township, Mansfield Township, Oxford Township, Washington Borough and Washington Township. The school has been accredited by the Middle States Association of Colleges and Schools Commission on Elementary and Secondary Schools since 2014.

As of the 2021–22 school year, the school had an enrollment of 1,126 students and 97.6 classroom teachers (on an FTE basis), for a student–teacher ratio of 11.5:1. There were 83 students (7.4% of enrollment) eligible for free lunch and none eligible for reduced-cost lunch.

History
The present high school building located on Jackson Valley Road in Washington Township opened in September 1967. Before the opening of the school, students had attended Washington High School, which was repurposed as the new district's junior high school. An expansion of the high school building was completed in 1992, which included a new library and gym to accommodate the addition of students in ninth grade. A second expansion at the high school during the first decade of the 21st century added more classrooms, office space, gym/weight rooms, and conversion of the original gym to a new library to meet growing enrollment in the district. Recently, the district added an all-purpose athletic field, tennis courts, and practice field on an acquired tract of land on Jackson Valley Road.

Student publications
The school has two newspapers and a Literary Magazine or "litmag" The official school paper The Streak has been publishing for 26 consecutive years and is published four times a year. The Renegade debuted in mid-June 2014 and is entirely run by students.

Awards, recognition and rankings
The school was the 172nd-ranked public high school in New Jersey out of 339 schools statewide in New Jersey Monthly magazine's September 2014 cover story on the state's "Top Public High Schools", using a new ranking methodology. The school had been ranked 168th in the state of 328 schools in 2012, after being ranked 202nd in 2010 out of 322 schools listed. The magazine ranked the school 179th in the magazine's September 2008 issue, which surveyed 316 schools across the state.   Schooldigger.com ranked the school tied for 173rd out of 381 public high schools statewide in its 2011 rankings (an increase of 54 positions from the 2010 ranking) which were based on the combined percentage of students classified as proficient or above proficient on the mathematics (79.6%) and language arts literacy (94.2%) components of the High School Proficiency Assessment (HSPA).

Controversy
A court case in 2002 was filed by a student for wearing a shirt the school deemed inappropriate.  The student was suspended after refusing to turn his shirt inside out. The student eventually filed a case that led to a decision by the United States Court of Appeals for the Third Circuit.

On June 21, 2013, during the graduation ceremony for the class of 2013, a former student streaked across the field. The former student managed to outrun both a police officer and man dressed in military uniform. He was later caught  into the woods behind the stadium and arrested.

Athletics 
The Warren Hills High School Blue Streaks compete in the Skyland Conference which is comprised of public and private high schools in Hunterdon, Somerset and Warren counties, and operates under the supervision of the New Jersey State Interscholastic Athletic Association (NJSIAA). The Blue Streaks nickname dates back to at least 1932. With 901 students in grades 10-12, the school was classified by the NJSIAA for the 2019–20 school year as Group III for most athletic competition purposes, which included schools with an enrollment of 761 to 1,058 students in that grade range. The football team competes in Division 3 of the Big Central Football Conference, which includes 60 public and private high schools in Hunterdon, Middlesex, Somerset, Union and Warren counties, which are broken down into 10 divisions by size and location. The school was classified by the NJSIAA as Group III North for football for 2018–2020. The school's traditional rival is Hackettstown High School, formerly of the Skyland Conference and now Northwest Jersey Athletic Conference, and the wrestling/football rival is Phillipsburg High School.

Wrestling
The Warren Hills wrestling program was started in 1936 by Frank Bennett, a member of the National Wrestling Hall of Fame and Museum who also started the program at Fair Lawn High School in Fair Lawn, New Jersey. Warren Hills wrestling ranks second all-time in the number of individual State Champions crowned.  It has produced such notables as Dan Slack, who beat future Olympian Bruce Baumgartner on the way to the State Heavyweight crown in 1977, and Ben Oberly who was a two-time State Champion (and placed 3rd his sophomore year) and ranked #1 at his weight in the nation in 1986. The 1990 state championship team went undefeated and is one of only a handful of teams in the state to have ever beaten rival Phillipsburg High School twice in one year.

Warren Hills holds one of the state's oldest wrestling tournaments, the John Goles Tournament, which honors one of the school's greatest coaches, and includes several wrestling programs from New Jersey and Pennsylvania. At the conclusion of the winter break tournament, there is a tourney champion and outstanding wrestler trophy presentation. Every year the wrestling team honors the record holders from previous events.

The wrestling team won the North II Group III state sectional championship in 1982, 1990, 1997, 1998 and 2007; the team won the Group III state championship in both 1990 and 1997. The team won the 2007 North II, Group III state sectional championship with a 33-29 victory against Scotch Plains-Fanwood High School.

Football
The football program is a member of the Big Central Football Conference, which was created through a merger of the Mid-State 38 Football Conference and the Greater Middlesex Conference, and is comprised of 61 schools from Hunterdon, Middlesex, Somerset, Union and Warren counties.

The 2000 football team (11-1) won the North II Group III state sectional title, with a 21-14 win against West Morris Central High School.

The program was awarded the 1973 NJSIAA Central Group title and the undefeated 1945 team was recognized with the North Group I title.

The program had an annual Thanksgiving game with rival Hackettstown until the 1940s. Flemington (now Hunterdon Central Regional High School) became the Thanksgiving rival until that school switched to challenge North Hunterdon High School in the late 1960s. From late 1960s until the game ended in the mid-1980s, the annual Thanksgiving opponent was Belvidere High School in Belvidere.

Field hockey
Since 1970, the field hockey program has won over 500 matches, and they have taken home numerous conference titles and several district titles. The girls field hockey team won the North II Group III state sectional title in 1984, 1996, 1997, 1999-2003, 2009 and 2012-2014 and won the North I Group III state sectional championship in 2015-2019. The team won the Group III championship in 2014 (defeating runner-up Ocean City High School in the final game of the tournament) and in 2015 (vs. Ocean City).

Between 2000 and 2014, the team had a record of 264-71-12 under coach Laurie Kerr, winning nine sectional titles. In 2014, after nine unsuccessful title-game appearances, the team won the program's first Group III state championship with a 5-4 win in overtime against Ocean City High School, a team that had beaten them six previous times in the championship game. The 2015 team repeated as Group III champion with a 1-0 win in the championship game, defeating Ocean City for the second year in a row.

Other sports 
The girls' bowling team won the Group III state title in 2017 and 2018. In 2017, the team won the Tournament of Champions, the first team from the northern part of the state to take the overall title.

In 2013, the school's varsity cheerleading team won the 2013 Skyland Conference, overall and Raritan. The cheerleading team won the NJCDCA Group III state championship title in 2017.

In 2016, the boys' basketball team won the North II Group III sectional championship. They came back from a 10-0 deficit at the start of the game and defeated the 19th-ranked team in the state Chatham High School by a final score of 52-46 to earn the program's first ever sectional championship.

Administration
The school's principal is Chris Kavcak. His administration team includes two assistant principals.

Notable alumni
 Halsey (born 1994 as Ashley Nicolette Frangipane, class of 2012), singer-songwriter.

References

External links 
Official website
Warren Hills Regional School District website

School data for Warren Hills Regional High School, National Center for Education Statistics
Warren Hills Regional High School sports coverage at The Express-Times

1967 establishments in New Jersey
Educational institutions established in 1967
Franklin Township, Warren County, New Jersey
Mansfield Township, Warren County, New Jersey
Oxford Township, New Jersey
Public high schools in Warren County, New Jersey
Washington, New Jersey
Washington Township, Warren County, New Jersey